Gord Stellick (born May 26, 1957 in Toronto, Ontario) is a Canadian sports broadcaster and former NHL executive. Stellick formerly hosted The Fan 590 Morning Show with Don Landry, and also appears on Hockey Central on Rogers Sportsnet. Currently, Stellick serves as host of the pre-game edition of "Blue And White Tonight" between 6PM-7PM on The Fan 590 during the game nights that the Toronto Maple Leafs play as well as the post-game edition of the show. Stellick is co-host of  the "NHL Morning Skate" drive time show with Scott Loughlin on SiriusXM Satellite Radio's NHL Network Radio. Stellick replaced former host Mike Ross, host of "Hockey Today" since 2009

Stellick was the General Manager of the Toronto Maple Leafs from April 1988 until August 1989. At the age of 30, he was the youngest GM in NHL history. He resigned on August 11, 1989, citing interference from Maple Leafs' owner Harold Ballard. Stellick was then hired by the New York Rangers as an assistant GM, but was fired in 1991.
Stellick was once co-owner of the Toronto Beaches Jr. A lacrosse team. Stellick can be seen on TV as a commentator for hockey games.

Stellick co-wrote, with Damien Cox, the book '67: The Maple Leafs, Their Sensational Victory and the End of an Empire, about the last season the Toronto Maple Leafs won the Stanley Cup.

References

External links 
Gord Stellick's columns on Sportsnet.ca
 

1957 births
Canadian bloggers
Canadian radio sportscasters
Canadian sports talk radio hosts
Canadian television sportscasters
Living people
National Hockey League broadcasters
National Hockey League executives
National Hockey League general managers
New York Rangers executives
Ice hockey people from Toronto
Toronto Maple Leafs announcers
Toronto Maple Leafs executives